Little Straggle Lake is a lake in the municipality of Dysart et al, Haliburton County in Central Ontario, Canada.

The primary inflow, at the south and arriving from Straggle Lake, and outflow, at the northwest, is Straggle Creek, which flows via Allen Creek, the York River and the Madawaska River to the Ottawa River.

References

Lakes of Haliburton County